San Tomaso Agordino (Ladin: San Tomas) is a comune (municipality) in the Province of Belluno in the Italian region Veneto, located about  north of Venice and about  northwest of Belluno.

The municipality of San Tomaso Agordino contains the frazione (subdivision) Pecol.

San Tomaso Agordino borders the following municipalities: Alleghe, Cencenighe Agordino, Rocca Pietore, Taibon Agordino, Vallada Agordina.

Demographic evolution

Twin towns
San Tomaso Agordino is twinned with:

  Massaranduba, Santa Catarina, Brazil, since 2011

References

Cities and towns in Veneto